The first season of New Era, the Iranian talent show, aired on the IRIB TV3 on 16 February 2019. More than 5,000 videos were sent to this program to display their talent. This season was aired on with 64 episode of 60 to 120 minutes.

Summary

Second round

Semi-final

Final

References

External links
 YJC
 ftdigital
 Khabar Online
 donya-e-eqtesad
 Tasnim

Iranian television series
2019 in Iranian television